Staying Italian: Urban Change and Ethnic Life in Postwar Toronto and Philadelphia is a 2009 book by Jordan Stanger-Ross published by the University of Chicago Press. The book compares and contrasts Italian Americans in South Philadelphia to Italian Canadians in Little Italy, Toronto, covering the post-World War II period, and how the two communities define what it means to have an "Italian" identity. The book compares and contrasts the communities' employment patterns, religious practices, marriage practices, and choices of housing in the respective real estate markets. Toronto's Italian community became geographically dispersed while Philadelphia's Italian community remained geographically concentrated; Stanger-Ross explained that the territoriality was more important to Philadelphia's Italians compared to Toronto's, and that the lack of new Italian immigration to Philadelphia contributed to this difference. In Philadelphia African-Americans were settling the city, and Italian Philadelphians feared that their neighborhood would be invaded by black people. Philadelphia's Italians were less likely to move out of South Philadelphia, compared to Toronto's Italians in regards to their Little Italy. In Toronto Italian immigration had continued, and therefore many of the Italians were recent immigrants. Many of them moved to outlying areas of the city and the suburbs.

Background
Sources used by the book include census data, church registers, ethnic presses, government studies, marriage records, oral histories, publications of Catholic parishes, and real estate records; the real estate records included mortgage records. The book also used secondary literature as sourcing.

Contents

The first chapter discusses the differences between the historical courses of Toronto and Philadelphia as a whole, while the other chapters discuss South Philadelphia and Little Italy in particular. One of the chapters discusses religion. Caroline Waldron Merithew of the University of Dayton stated that in this chapter "the comparative North American framework's purpose and possibility shine" and that the chapter is the book's "most vital contribution to the understanding of Italian ethnicity". The book's illustrations include graphs, maps, and photographs.

Stanger-Ross intentionally avoided discussing assimilation in the book. Maria C. Lizzi of the University of Albany argued that the book should have discussed assimilation, while John J. Bukowczyk of Wayne State University stated that the omission was "an understandable limitation".

Reception

Lizzi stated that the book was "a step forward for ethnic historians of the post-war period", but that it is "impeded" by several issues, with the most significant being the omission of race relations such as Italian-American and African-American relations in Philadelphia. Lizzi argued that the lack of discussion of issues regarding assimilation and, to a lesser extent, class status were problematic.

Bukowczyk stated that scholars from the United States "will find this book an interesting and worthwhile read." He stated that the relations of blacks and whites in Philadelphia is a "relatively ignored elephant in the room" even though Stanger-Ross stated that such dynamics were present in Philadelphia but not in Toronto.

William Michelson of the University of Toronto stated that the book is "a rich examination of the persistence of and variations in Italian culture in North American cities-and a fascinating read." He suggested that the book could have added more macro knowledge.

Carmela Patrias of Brock University stated that this book was "fruitful" research.

Merithew stated that the book "adds crucial geographic and chronological breadth to scholarship on Italian immigration." She argued that the book should have better explained its photographs and explained how racism impacted demography of the Italians in Philadelphia as urban decay occurred.

Roberto Perin of York University wrote that "this book fills an important void in the field of North American immigration and ethnicity where publications on the post-war period are few and far between."

See also
 Building Little Italy
 History of the Italian Americans in Philadelphia
 Italian Canadians in the Greater Toronto Area

References
 Bukowczyk, John J. (Wayne State University). "Staying Italian: Urban Change and Ethnic Life in Postwar Toronto and Philadelphia" (Book-Review) The American Historical Review, Vol.116(5), p. 1450-1451.
 Dilworth, Richardson (Drexel University). "Staying Italian: Urban Change and Ethnic Life in Postwar Toronto and Philadelphia." Urban History Review, 09/2011. p. 61.-62.
 Lizzi, Maria C. (University of Albany). "Staying Italian: Urban Change and Ethnic Life in Postwar Toronto and Philadelphia by Jordon Stanger-Ross" (review). American Studies, 2010, Vol.51(3), pp. 218–220.
 Merithew, Caroline Waldron (University of Dayton). "Staying Italian: Urban Change and Ethnic Life in Postwar Toronto and Philadelphia" (review). Journal of Social History, 2011, Vol.45(1), pp. 276–277.
 Michelson, William (University of Toronto). "Staying Italian: Urban Change and Ethnic Life in Postwar Toronto and Philadelphia" (review). Contemporary Sociology, 1 January 2011, Vol.40(1), pp. 92–94.
 Patrias, Carmela (Brock University). "New Directions in Immigration and Ethnic History." Journal of Canadian Studies/Revue d'études canadiennes, 2011, Vol.45(2), pp. 229–237.
 Perin, Roberto (York University). "Staying Italian: Urban Change and Ethnic Life in Post-war Toronto and Philadelphia." Urban History, 12/2010, Volume 37, Issue 3.

Notes

External links
 Staying Italian - University of Chicago Press

2009 non-fiction books
Italian-American culture in Philadelphia
Italian-American literature
Books about race and ethnicity